Anna Schmiedlová was the defending champion but chose not to participate.

Wildcard Alexa Glatch won the title, defeating the top seed Madison Brengle in an all-American final, 6–2, 6–7(6–8), 6–3.

Seeds

Main draw

Finals

Top half

Bottom half

References 
 Main draw

Wilde Lexus Women's USTA Pro Circuit Event - Singles